MSLR may refer to -

The Manchester, Sheffield and Lincolnshire Railway
The Mid-Suffolk Light Railway